Maleki may refer to:

Places
Malaki, Hormozgan
Maleki, Khuzestan
Maleki, Sistan and Baluchestan
Maleki, South Khorasan

Other uses
Maleki (surname)
Meleke, architectural term

See also
Maliki (disambiguation)
Malikism (disambiguation)
Milaki, Iran (disambiguation)
Aliabad-e Maleki
Sarab-e Maleki
Shand-e Maleki